The list of ship launches in 1727 includes a chronological list of some ships launched in 1727.


References

1727
Ship launches